Cybersource is a payment service provider founded in 1994.

In November 2007, Cybersource acquired the U.S. small business payment services provider Authorize.Net for $565 million.

On April 22, 2010, Visa Inc. acquired Cybersource for $2 billion.

See also 
List of on-line payment service providers

References

Companies based in Foster City, California
Visa acquisitions
American companies established in 1994
Financial services companies established in 1994
1994 establishments in California
2010 mergers and acquisitions
Payment service providers
Online payments
Internet fraud